Stephen Harrison (born 31 October 1960) is a British classicist and a professor of Latin at the University of Oxford. He has published widely on the poetry of Virgil and Horace.

Life and career
Having read Classics at Balliol College, Harrison has taught Latin literature at the University of Oxford since 1987. In addition, he has been an occasional visiting professor at the universities of Copenhagen and Trondheim. While his research focuses on the poetry of Virgil and Horace, he has also written on the reception of classical literature and the Roman novel. He is a fellow of Corpus Christi College, Oxford.

In 2022 he was bestowed an honorary doctorate from the Norwegian University of Science and Technology.

Selected publications 
 Apuleius : A Latin Sophist, Oxford University Press, 2000.
 A Companion to Latin Literature, ed. Blackwell, 2005.
  Framing the Ass: Literary Form in Apuleius Metamorphoses, Oxford University Press 2013.
 Horace: Odes 2, Cambridge University Press, 2017.

References 

British classical scholars
Scholars of Latin literature
Fellows of Corpus Christi College, Oxford
Academic staff of the University of Copenhagen
Academic staff of the Norwegian University of Science and Technology
1960 births
Living people
Alumni of Balliol College, Oxford